Atomic Power is an American short documentary film produced by The March of Time and released to theaters August 9, 1946, one year after the end of World War II. It was nominated for an Academy Award for Best Documentary Short.

Raymond Fielding, chronicler of The March of Time, cites Atomic Power as the only one of the series' postwar films to emerge as a classic. "It tells of the making of the atomic bomb, and is a quite remarkable example of film making in the March of Time tradition," Fielding wrote.

Nearly every person involved in the invention of the atomic bomb performs as an actor in the film, recreating the events and conversations that led up to the Trinity test, which is also reenacted and intercut with government footage of the blast. Jack Glenn directed.

Reception
The National Board of Review called Atomic Power "a vivid short … a good condensation of masses of material into simple, clear exposition". Atomic Power was nominated for an Academy Award for Best Documentary Short.

See also
 List of films about nuclear issues
 List of books about nuclear issues

References

External links
 
 

1946 films
1946 documentary films
1946 short films
Black-and-white documentary films
American short documentary films
American black-and-white films
The March of Time films
20th Century Fox short films
1940s short documentary films
Documentary films about nuclear war and weapons
J. Robert Oppenheimer
1940s English-language films
1940s American films